David Edward Bentley (7 August 1935 – 4 March 2020) was an English bishop.  He was first the Bishop of Lynn and, subsequently, the Bishop of Gloucester in the Church of England.

Bentley was educated at Great Yarmouth Grammar School and the University of Leeds. He studied for ordination at Westcott House, Cambridge and was ordained in 1961. He began his ordained ministry as a curate at St Ambrose's Bristol and Holy Trinity with St Mary in Guildford; after which he was rector of Headley, East Hampshire, Rural Dean of Esher and (his final position before ordination to the episcopate) Warden of the Community of All Hallows, Ditchingham. He was consecrated as a bishop on 22 July 1986, by Robert Runcie, Archbishop of Canterbury, at Southwark Cathedral. On retirement he moved to Lichfield where he was an Honorary Assistant Bishop in the Diocese of Lichfield. His two sons in law are Suffragan Bishops.

He died on 4 March 2020 at the age of 84.

References 

1935 births
2020 deaths
Alumni of the University of Leeds
Alumni of Westcott House, Cambridge
Bishops of Lynn
Bishops of Gloucester
20th-century Church of England bishops
21st-century Church of England bishops
People educated at Great Yarmouth Grammar School